On 1 or 2 August 1537 (both dates are given in sources), near the Tuscan village of Montemurlo, the forces of the newly installed Duke Cosimo I of Florence defeated a hastily organized army of those who wished to overthrow the Medici and restore the Republic of Florence.  Following the battle, Cosimo's bloody vengeance on all those who opposed Medici rule effectively ended organized opposition to his family in Florence.  The victory led to the decision of Emperor Charles V to formally recognize Cosimo as Duke of Florence on 30 September 1537.

References

Montemurlo
Montemurlo
1537 in Italy
1537 in Europe
Montemurlo